A Riker mount is a flat container used for mounting a specimen (typically plant or insect) on cotton wool or other backing material, often with transparent glass or plastic cover as protection. It is named after Albert Joyce Riker (1894-1982), noted American plant pathologist.

References
 Merriam-Webster Dictionary

Containers